Anthony Gomez Mancini (born 6 April 2001) is a French professional footballer who plays for English club Accrington Stanley, as a midfielder.

Club career
Born in Saint-Priest, Mancini spent his early career in his native France with Saint Priest, Lyon, Tours and Angers II. He then played for English club Burnley, before signing for Accrington Stanley in February 2023.

International career
Mancini has represented France at under-18 and under-19 level.

Personal life
He is of Spanish descent.

References

2001 births
Living people
French footballers
France youth international footballers
People from Lyon Metropolis
Championnat National 2 players
Association football midfielders
English Football League players
AS Saint-Priest players
Olympique Lyonnais players
Tours FC players
Angers SCO players
Burnley F.C. players
Accrington Stanley F.C. players
French expatriate footballers
French expatriate sportspeople in England
Expatriate footballers in England